Hiiu is a subdistrict in the district of Nõmme, Tallinn, the capital of Estonia.

Hiiu has a station on the Elron western route. The first narrow gauge railway station was built to Hiiu in 1913.

Gallery

See also
Hiiu Stadium

References

Subdistricts of Tallinn